Philip St. Hill is a Barbadian politician and diplomat. He is the Barbados Ambassador to Republic of Cuba. St. Hill is the first appointed Ambassador to Cuba. He was appointed Ambassador in October 2020.

References 

Living people
Barbadian politicians
Barbadian diplomats
Ambassadors of Barbados to Cuba
Year of birth missing (living people)